is a term used in Japanese martial arts to describe free-style practice (sparring). The term denotes an exercise in 取り tori, applying technique to a random ( 乱 ran) succession of uke attacks. 

The actual connotation of randori depends on the martial art it is used in. In judo, jujutsu, and Shodokan aikido, among others, it most often refers to one-on-one sparring where partners attempt to resist and counter each other's techniques. In other styles of aikido, in particular Aikikai, it refers to a form of practice in which a designated aikidoka defends against multiple attackers in quick succession without knowing how they will attack or in what order.

In Japan
The term is used in aikido, judo, and Brazilian jiu-jitsu dojos outside Japan. In Japan, this form of practice is called , which literally means multiple attackers.

In Judo
The term was described by Jigoro Kano, the founder of Judo, in a speech at the 1932 Los Angeles Olympic Games: "Randori, meaning "free exercise", is practiced under conditions of actual contest. It includes throwing, choking, holding the opponent down, and bending or twisting of the arms. The two combatants may use whatever methods they like provided they do not hurt each other and obey the rules of Judo concerning etiquette, which are essential to its proper working."

There are 2 types of Randori.

In Aikido
Most commonly: One attacker, two or multiple attackers rush toward tori and try to grab both elbows. Tori's challenge is to apply strategy, quick taisabaki, and to maintain aikido's approach which is - avoiding as much as possible from hurting the attackers. Therefore, tori does not punch, but rather tries to avoid the attacks or to throw the attackers.In some aikido styles, the attack is free, and so are the techniques applied - as long as they follow the principles of aikido.

In Karate
Although in karate the word kumite is usually reserved for sparring, some schools also employ the term randori with regard to "mock-combat" in which both karateka move with speed, parrying and attacking with all four limbs (including knees, elbows, etc.). In these schools, the distinction between randori and kumite is that in randori, the action is uninterrupted when a successful technique is applied. (Also known as ju kumite or soft sparring.)

In ninjutsu
Randori is also practiced in Bujinkan ninjutsu and usually represented to the practitioner when he reaches the "Shodan" level. In ninjutsu, randori puts the practitioner in a position where he is armed or unarmed and is attacked by multiple attackers.

See also
 Kata
 Sparring
 Randori-no-kata

References

External links
 Judo Information Site
 YouTube: Randori In Tenshin Aikido

Aikido
Japanese martial arts
Japanese martial arts terminology
Judo
Mock combat
Training